Jacob Mishler (April 20, 1911 – January 26, 2004) was a United States district judge of the United States District Court for the Eastern District of New York from 1960 to 2004 and its Chief Judge from 1969 to 1980.

Education and career

Born in New York City, New York, Mishler received a Bachelor of Science degree from New York University in 1931. He received a Juris Doctor from New York University School of Law in 1933. He was in private practice of law in Long Island City, New York from 1934 to 1959. He was a Justice of the Supreme Court of New York in 1959. He was in private practice of law in Long Island City in 1960.

Federal judicial service

Mishler was nominated by President Dwight D. Eisenhower on June 10, 1960, to a seat on the United States District Court for the Eastern District of New York vacated by Judge Mortimer W. Byers. He was confirmed by the United States Senate on July 2, 1960, and received his commission on July 6, 1960. He served as Chief Judge from 1969 to 1980. He assumed senior status on April 30, 1980. He served as a member of the Judicial Conference of the United States from 1974 to 1977. His service was terminated on January 26, 2004, due to his death in West Palm Beach, Florida.

See also
List of Jewish American jurists

References

External links
 

Judges of the United States District Court for the Eastern District of New York
United States district court judges appointed by Dwight D. Eisenhower
20th-century American judges
1911 births
2004 deaths